Yang Xian may refer to:

 Yang County or Yang Xian, in Shaanxi, China
 Yang Xian (Ming dynasty), Ming dynasty official
 Bernard Yeung or Yang Xian, Singaporean economist
 Yang Xian (chess player)

See also
 Yixing, formerly Yangxian